William Dwane Bell (born 1978) is a New Zealander who was convicted of three murders at the Panmure RSA in 2001 and is serving a 30-year non-parole life sentence at Paremoremo Prison. He has more than 100 other criminal convictions, including theft, fraud, unlawful taking of motor vehicles, burglary, entering with intent, demands with intent to steal, aggravated robbery, presenting a firearm, impersonating police, assault, trespass, traffic and drug offences.

Early life
Bell grew up in Mangere where his father was a gang member with a tough reputation who spent time in prison. His father beat him when he was young. Around this time they noticed their son's behaviour starting to change.

His father noted that he "wanted to be better than the gang that I was in, he wanted to be in another bigger gang, bigger than me."

Murders at the RSA 

In February 1997, aged 19, Bell was turned down for a job at a service station in Mangere because he smoked cannabis. He severely attacked an attendant from behind with a stolen police baton and stole the cash register drawer. Bell was sentenced to five years and nine months in prison for aggravated robbery, the judge saying the robbery was almost incidental to the attack, which could have resulted in the attendant's death. He served most of the sentence in Paremoremo Prison, and was released in July 2001 after serving three-and-a-half years. Based on the law at the time, Bell was automatically released after serving two thirds of his sentence. The parole board had no say in the release, other than to set release conditions. The Board imposed five conditions, including seeing a psychologist, alcohol and drug counselling, and to work in a job approved by his probation officer.

Bell was assigned to the Mangere probation office which was supposed to monitor his compliance, but not one of the five conditions was met. He found work experience at the RSA in Panmure but never told his probation officer. He lasted only two weeks before he was told to leave. Two months later, on 8 December 2001, he came back, bludgeoned and shot three people to death—the club president, a club member and an employee. He seriously injured a fourth—Susan Couch who was also an employee at the club. Ms Couch received brain damage and other permanent injuries in the incident and subsequently tried to sue the Corrections Department for $2 million in damages. Bell's co-offender, Darnell Kere Tupe, went with him to the club but remained outside while Bell committed the murders inside.

According to witnesses who testified at his trial, Bell was up all night drinking and smoking cannabis before the murders which occurred at about 8:00 a.m. the following morning. He admitted he was using methamphetamine and apparently told his family he 'blacked out' while inside the RSA.

Bell was jailed for life, with a minimum non-parole period of 33 years initially. The non-parole period was reduced to 30 years on appeal. He was also sentenced to 13 years' imprisonment for attempted murder and a concurrent 12 years for aggravated robbery. Tupe was sentenced to 12 years for manslaughter and concurrent terms for aggravated robbery.

Internal inquiry by Corrections 
The Corrections Department conducted an internal inquiry to examine the management of Bell's release by the probation service. The department did not blame Bell for breaching his release conditions; it blamed understaffing, low morale and poor management within the Mangere probation service. It also blamed the police for failing to act when he committed a minor offence a month before the murders. The management of his release conditions was so poor that the department acknowledged 11 separate mistakes which they referred to as 'areas of poor management'.

Injury

Compensation claim
Eleven years after the attacks, Corrections announced it would be offering Susan Couch $300,000 in punitive damages. Couch's lawyer Brian Henry said the payment represented only $10,000 a year for 30 years. Indicating that the next battle would be with ACC, he said: "We still need to get proper compensation. In terms of negligence actions, proper compensation is $10 million." Her compensation was welcomed by victims' rights groups such as the Sensible Sentencing Trust.

References

1978 births
Living people
New Zealand people convicted of murder
People convicted of murder by New Zealand
Place of birth missing (living people)
People from Māngere